Brian Glubok (born 1959) is a professional American bridge player. Glubok is from New York City and graduated from Amherst College.

Glubok finished second in the World Mixed Pairs Championship in Philadelphia in 2010. Glubok has won 5 North American Bridge Championships.

Bridge accomplishments

Wins

 North American Bridge Championships (5)
 Jacoby Open Swiss Teams (3) 1996, 1997, 1999 
 Reisinger (1) 1990 
 Spingold (1) 1987

Runners-up

 World Mixed Pairs Championship (1) 2010
 North American Bridge Championships
 Blue Ribbon Pairs (1) 1990 
 Grand National Teams (4) 1981, 2009, 2012, 2013 
 Jacoby Open Swiss Teams (1) 2007 
 Mitchell Board-a-Match Teams (2) 1994, 2003 
 Reisinger (1) 2008 
 Spingold (4) 1980, 1983, 1986, 2008

Notes

External links
 

Living people
American contract bridge players
1959 births
Place of birth missing (living people)
Date of birth missing (living people)
Sportspeople from New York City
Amherst College alumni